RIPFEST collaborative film project is an annual filmmaking project run by a collaborative group of film and television producers and past participants. The organization assigns several teams of filmmakers, and gives them two weeks to write, shoot and edit a complete, original short film. Started in 2002, there have been 10 RIPFEST events in New York City and LA, producing more than 80 original short films. RIPFEST #11 begins April 10, 2010, shoots April 17–18, and Premieres April 26.

RIPFEST collaborative film project is one of the few film festivals that makes its own films.

Schedule
For each group, a Producer, writer, composer, director, cinematographer, editor, and 2–4 actors are chosen. The group must follow a strict schedule:
– 2 days for re-writes
– 2 days for pre-production
– 2 days to shoot the film
– 1 week for post-production, scoring, and graphics.

History
RIPFEST began as the film division of a non-profit arts organization called Raw Impressions, in May 2002. Since then, it has developed into a collaboratively run film group based in New York City.  Founding members include David Rodwin, Erik Bryan Slavin, Chris Tiné, Jackie Stolfi and Bruce Kennedy.

References
Kilian, Michael (2005). "Creating Movie Musicals in a Hurry Is A Ripfest", Chicago Tribune, (6).

External links
 RIPFEST official website
 CBS News story

Collaborative projects